MNL48 is a Filipino girl group formed in 2018 as a sister group of the Japanese idol group AKB48. The 1st generation members have been selected through live auditions in a noontime show It's Showtime. On May 2, 2018, they formed the current 3 teams (Team MII, Team NIV, and Team L). As of May 2021, The group consists of 45 members. Among these members are the Kenkyuusei or Research Students.

Members that left the group are considered "graduates" and sometimes given a special graduation show or graduation concert. There are also cases where a member resigns, dismissed, or get terminated.

The First Generation Center Shekinah Arzaga of Team MII is the current overall captain of MNL48, after replacing the first captain, Alice Margarita De Leon on March 17, 2021.

Overview 

MNL48 consists of 28 official members. On December 15, 2022 at their MNL48 Christmas Concert, they announced of dissolution of teams, they separated by generations instead. In between, they were grouped into three teams. The teams were:
Team MII (read as Team M Two) – associated with the color  and is the 2nd Team M in AKB48 Group after NMB48's Team M.
Team NIV (read as Team N Four) – associated with the color  and is the 4th Team N in AKB48 Group after NMB48's Team N, SNH48's Team NII, and NGT48's Team NIII.
Team L –  associated with the color  and is the 1st Team L in AKB48 Group's history.

The Tokyo Girls Collection Senbatsu (widely known as Trainees or Kenkyuusei) was established. It was existed until November 4, 2021.

Current Lineup

Membership Timeline

Former Members

2018 Graduates 

A total of 5 official members, all from the 1st Generation. 4 were officially graduated, and 1 resigned.

2019 Graduates 

A total of 13 official members, all from the 1st Generation, left the group in 2019. 8 were outranked in the 2nd General Election, 2 resigned, 2 graduated, and 1 was dismissed.

2020 Graduates 

A total of 5 official members (including 9 graduating members) left the group in 2020. Most of its members applied for the Third General Election, but retired for their application.

2021 Graduates 

A total of 14 official members have left the group in 2021

2022 Graduates

Former Understudies 

Former Kenkyuusei or Trainees who never been promoted. 15 from 1st Generation (12 of them resigned in 2018 and 3 in 2019) and 1 from 2nd Generation.

Former Candidates/Aspirants 

Former MNL48 Candidates and Aspirants (Withdrew candidacy/didn't rank)

First Generation

Second Generation

Third Generation

Leadership History

MNL48 Overall Captain

MNL48 Generation Captains

MNL48 Team Captains

Notes

References

External links 

 List of members  on the official homepage

MNL48
AKB48 Group members
MNL48